The Battle of Chalk Bluff (May 1 – 2, 1863), also known as the Skirmish at Chalk Bluff, was a military engagement of the American Civil War. The battle was fought near Chalk Bluff, northwest of St. Francis (present-day Clay County, Arkansas), where U.S. Brigadier General William Vandever, commanding the Second Division of the Army of the Frontier, was repulsed in an attempt to prevent Confederate General John S. Marmaduke's Division from crossing the St. Francis River. Though a Confederate victory, Marmaduke suffered considerable casualties and his momentum had been checked, forcing him to abandon his second expedition into Missouri.

Background
Marmaduke departed his camps in Arkansas in the spring of 1863 with 5,000 cavalrymen, bound for southeastern Missouri. In sharp fighting at the Battle of Cape Girardeau, Marmaduke was defeated, and he began a withdrawal on April 27 towards Helena, Arkansas. His line of march was on a road on Crowley's Ridge, a long rise that offered protection for his flanks, as the surrounding terrain was mainly marshy. Union forces under Vandever had pursued Marmaduke through Missouri to Chalk Bluff, Arkansas, where Marmaduke planned to cross the St. Francis River, whose steep chalky white clay banks made fording the river difficult for cavalry.

In an attempt to protect his men while they were crossing the river, Marmaduke set up a rear guard along the ridge that he hoped would protect his engineers and pioneers as they constructed a bridge strong enough to allow the passage of his entire division. He formed an initial defensive line at the hamlet of Four Mile, while posting his reserves in a second line a mile away at Gravel Hill, on the crest of the ridge above the river. They began digging entrenchments to forestall any Union attack.

Battle
Fighting began on May 1 and continued into the next day. Vandever's men were unable to drive the Confederates from the heights. Although Marmaduke's rear guard sustained heavy casualties, it delayed the numerically superior Union forces long enough as to allow for the construction team to finish building the bridge and allow Marmaduke’s main force to cross the river. However, because of the heavy casualties that were suffered by the Confederates, Marmaduke was forced to end the expedition and return to his camp.

Confederate sources including Gen. Marmaduke and a few letters from Confederate enlisted soldiers differ by stating the union forces suffered significant casualties in trying to take the entrenched ridges. Gen. Thompson moved the artillery across the river by raft the first night,so while trying to take the ridges the union forces were suffering cannon fire coming over their right shoulder and continuing down the long line of their formation.

Aftermath
While, in some respects, Marmaduke tactically won the Battle of Chalk Bluff, the Union forces claimed a strategic victory since he had abandoned his spring offensive.

Battlefield preservation
The battle is commemorated today in the small Chalk Bluff Battlefield Park, which preserves a portion of the field and has been listed on the National Register of Historic Places. The Chalk Bluff Hiking Trail traverses parts of the battlefield, with interpretive wayside markers and panels. A few minor skirmishes occurred there later in the war as both armies sent raiding parties to control the river crossing.

The towns of Chalk Bluff, Four Mile and Gravel Hill are no longer extant.

See also 
Arkansas in the American Civil War
List of American Civil War battles
Missouri in the American Civil War
Trans-Mississippi Theater of the American Civil War
Troop engagements of the American Civil War, 1863

References

Further reading
 Wright, V.C., & Laud Payne, "The Battle of Chalk Bluff..." Piggott, Arkansas: 1953.

External links
 142nd Anniversary of the Battle of Chalk Bluff
 Chalk Bluff Battlefield, Blog Post
 Civil War Arkansas 1863 Mark Christ, University of Oklahoma Press

1863 in Arkansas
1863 in Missouri
Battles of the Trans-Mississippi Theater of the American Civil War
Chalf Bluff
Chalf Bluff
Chalk Bluff, Arkansas
Confederate victories of the American Civil War
Conflicts in 1863
Dunklin County, Missouri
Marmaduke's Second Expedition into Missouri
May 1863 events